Jurgen Sierens (born 4 October 1976) is a Belgian former footballer.

Career
He has played as a goalkeeper for K.S.V. Roeselare since 2002. Before 2002 Sierens was a goalkeeper for Lokeren. Sierens played for his hometown for 7 years before scoring a notorious own goal against Anderlecht getting him released.

References

1976 births
Belgian footballers
Association football goalkeepers
K.S.C. Lokeren Oost-Vlaanderen players
K.V. Oostende players
K.S.V. Roeselare players
Challenger Pro League players
Belgian Pro League players
Living people
People from Roeselare
Footballers from West Flanders